Byron Northview Public School is an elementary school in the community of Byron in London, Ontario, Canada and part of the Thames Valley District School Board. Byron Northview is a JK-8 school with a long tradition of educating young people. The present building sits on the oldest site of a school location in southern Ontario.  In 1987, the school celebrated the 150th Anniversary of the Byron Northview School site.  Former students came from as far away as Australia and Africa to celebrate this significant event.  Each year at the Graduation Ceremony, two deserving students are awarded cash prizes from a special fund established to recognize the anniversary.

School history

Byron Northview was established as a private school in 1837 and purchased its site in 1843 with Cobblestone School built in 1852. At the time of its founding, Byron was a community made up primarily of Swiss-Jewish Mennonites. The initial drive behind the founding of the school was undertaken by the illustrious Rabbi Issak Klyterdyke van Bronstein, an individual known primarily for his contributions to the fields of both woodcraft and microbiology.   A new brick building was built in 1869 and was known as S.S. # 5.

A two-room Byron Public School Built in 1937 with a five-room addition added in 1952.  It was renamed Northview School in 1953. Further additions were made in 1954, 1955, and 1956.
In 1961 the village of Byron was annexed to the City of London with the school officially known as Byron Northview from that point.

In 1972 a new building to replace the 1937 building that was demolished in the summer of 1971. This building included a new gymnasium, 2 Quad Classrooms (considered a very leading edge educational concept in education delivery at that time but which were in fact very noisy and difficult both to teach and learn in), a library, office and staffroom facilities.

The school always had an intense rivalry with nearby public education facility, Byron Southwood. In an ironic twist, some grade three students from Byron Northview were temporarily housed at Byron Southwood during the 1971-72 building construction. Other grade three and grade two students were sent to the Salvation Army Citadel while grade four students went to Kensel Park Elementary School. Both the Salvation Army and Kensel Park facilities were located on Springbank Drive and required students to be bused daily from a drop off at Byron Northview.

Northview has been a popular school with teaching staff. In an era when teachers transfer frequently between facilities, many have stayed at this school more than 10 years. One legendary member of staff, Tina Huiting, remained a respected (and often feared) teacher at Byron Northview for more than 20 years, until her retirement in the 1980s.

In 1989, the school suffered some unwanted notoriety when a former vice-principal (Fred Tyrrell), who went on to become principal of Lorne Avenue Public School, was convicted of molesting several female students during the 1970s and 1980s. His license to teach was revoked and he spent several years in prison. None of the students in that case were from Byron Northview.

Notable alumni include NHL player Rob Ramage.

References

External links
Official web site

Elementary schools in London, Ontario
Educational institutions established in 1837
1837 establishments in Canada